Typhoon Imbudo, known in the Philippines as Typhoon Harurot, was a powerful typhoon that struck the Philippines and southern China in July 2003. The seventh named storm and fourth typhoon of the season, Imbudo formed on July 15 to the east of the Philippines. The storm moved generally west-northward for much of its duration due to a ridge to the north. Favorable conditions allowed Imbudo to intensify, gradually at first before undergoing rapid deepening on July 19. The typhoon made landfall on northern Luzon near peak intensity on July 22, but quickly weakened over land. Once in the South China Sea, Imbudo re-intensified slightly before making its final landfall in southern China near Yangjiang on July 24, dissipating the next day.

In the Philippines, Imbudo was the strongest typhoon in five years, causing widespread flooding and power outages in the Cagayan Valley for weeks. Damage was heaviest in Isabela province near where the storm struck. Most of the banana crop was destroyed, and other crops sustained similar but lesser damage. Imbudo disrupted transportation across much of Luzon. Nationwide, the storm damaged or destroyed 62,314 houses, causing P4.7 billion (PHP, $86 million USD) in damage, mostly in the Cagayan Valley. There were also 64 deaths in the country. In Hong Kong, strong winds killed a man after knocking him off a platform. In China, damage was heaviest in Guangdong where the storm struck. Thousands of trees fell, and 595,000 houses were wrecked. Hundreds of canceled flights stranded travelers across the region. In Guangxi, high rainfall increased water levels in 45 reservoirs to warning levels. In Guangxi and Guangdong, collectively 20 people were killed, and damage reached about ¥4.45 billion (CNY, US$297 million).

Meteorological history

The origins of Imbudo were from a disorganized area of convection near Chuuk in the open western Pacific in mid-July. With weak wind shear, the system slowly became better organized. On July 15, the Japan Meteorological Agency (JMA) estimated that a tropical depression formed. The next day, the Joint Typhoon Warning Center (JTWC) issued a tropical cyclone formation alert (TCFA), noting that outflow had increased due to an upper-level low to the northeast. A subtropical ridge near Okinawa steered the nascent depression to the west-northwest for much of its duration. With warm waters and favorable upper-level conditions, the depression quickly organized, and the JMA upgraded it to Tropical Storm Imbudo on July 17.

The JMA upgraded Imbudo to a severe tropical storm late on July 18, around the same time that the JTWC upgraded it to a typhoon. An increase in outflow to the south and to the north from a tropical upper tropospheric trough (TUTT) caused a 36‑hour period of rapid development beginning on July 19. By late on July 20, the typhoon had developed concentric eyewalls, and the TUTT was moving away, thus diminishing outflow.

Rapidly weakening over land, Imbudo emerged into the South China Sea about six hours after landfall. Dry air prevented convection from redeveloping significantly, and the eye had become large over open waters. At 0300 UTC on July 24, Imbudo made its final landfall west of Macau, near Yangjiang, Guangdong. The storm rapidly weakened over land while moving over southern China. Late on July 25, Imbudo dissipated near the border of China and Vietnam.

Preparations
Before Imbudo struck, officials evacuated over 14,000 people to at least 60 shelters. Government offices were closed along the typhoon's path, and schools were closed in the capital, Manila. PAGASA issued a number 4 warning signal, the highest level, for three northern provinces, indicating the imminent threat of a powerful storm. Despite the warning, a post-storm survey in Isabela province indicated that 34% were unaware of the storm's arrival, while others believed the typhoon would not be as strong. In Manila, four flights were canceled at Ninoy Aquino International Airport, and the Manila Light Rail Transit System was shut down for two hours. Travel by ship and bus were halted in some areas. On July 22 before the storm struck, the Philippine military was put on red alert, increasing security at the presidential palace. The military stated it was due to the typhoon, although newspapers suggested it was to prevent a coup attempt; a failed coup ultimately did occur on July 27 in what would become known as the Oakwood mutiny.

The Hong Kong Observatory issued a number 8 warning signal, indicating the potential for gale-force winds within the territory. At Hong Kong International Airport, at least 100 flights were canceled or delayed. Most ferry and some bus lines were temporarily suspended. The threat of the storm caused 16 flights to be canceled and another 54 delayed at Guangzhou Baiyun International Airport. On Hainan island, 32 canceled flights stranded about 1,500 travelers.  The threat of the storm forced British Prime Minister Tony Blair to shorten a trip to the territory. The Hong Kong Stock Exchange opened 30 minutes late as a result of the typhoon. On the mainland at Yangjiang, more than 30,000 people evacuated ahead of the storm.

Impact

Philippines

Typhoon Imbudo was the strongest typhoon to strike Luzon since Typhoon Zeb five years prior, and was the fifth storm in eight weeks to affect the country. The typhoon left widespread areas flooded for several days. Cagayan Valley was largely isolated after a bridge was damaged in Ilocos Norte. Damage was heavy in the region, totaling P2.2 billion (PHP, $40 million USD), and over 80,000 people were displaced by the storm. Damage was heaviest in Isabela, where damage was estimated at P1.9 billion (PHP, US$35 million), mostly to crops and killed livestock. There, winds and rain knocked down trees and caused a province-wide power outage. Most trees less than three years old fell during the high winds. In Isabela province, the banana crop was almost entirely destroyed, and most of the corn and rice crops were heavily damaged. The high damage caused the gross regional product, or overall economy of the Cagayan Valley, to decrease by 0.3% than what would have happened without the typhoon.

Power outages affected Metro Manila, and several billboards were damaged in the city, although there was minimal flooding in the capital. Adverse conditions caused the Manila Light Rail Transit System Line 1 to close for two hours, stranding hundreds. High winds knocked over a  tree that killed five on Romblon Island. The rains brought the Magat Dam on Luzon to capacity. Landslides blocked a national highway in Nueva Ecija with debris and fallen trees, which were quickly cleared within a few days. On Mindanao, flash flooding from the outer periphery of the storm affected 18 towns, killing 11 people. In Maguindanao in the southern Philippines, flooding washed away 50 houses, forcing over 2,000 people to evacuate. Damage extended as far south as the Western Visayas. Across the Philippines, Imbudo damaged 62,314 houses, of which about 20% were destroyed. Housing damage was estimated at P1.2 billion (PHP, US$22 million), most of which in the Cagayan Valley. Overall damage in the country was estimated at P4.7 billion (PHP, US$86 million). Of the total, about P1.9 billion (PHP, US$35 million) was in agriculture damage. Imbudo killed 64 people in the Philippines, mostly in Cagayan Valley, and injured another 154.

Elsewhere

Early in its developmental stages, Imbudo affected portions of Micronesia, particularly Ulithi. The rainfall from the passing tropical cyclone caused $75,000 in property damage and $25,000 in agricultural and crop-related damage.

Before Imbudo struck mainland China, it passed south of Taiwan, dropping heavy rainfall reaching  in Taitung County. The outer rainbands reached as far as Okinawa, where  was reported.

High winds killed a man after knocking him off a platform. The winds knocked down 83 trees, injuring 11 people. Rough waves injured 34 people traveling by boat near Lantau Island. In the territory, ten boats were damaged or sank, and one fishing pier was damaged.

At its final landfall in Guangdong, Imbudo produced strong winds, with a peak gust of  measured at Shangchuan Island. At Yangjiang, gusts reached , causing eleven boats to sink. There, over 10,000 trees fell due to the strong winds, more than half in the city, and 7,649 homes were damaged or destroyed. In Zhanjiang, the storm damaged power lines and water pumps, leaving residents without access to water. Imbudo spawned tornadoes in Luoding and Zhanjiang, damaging dozens of houses and killing 6,000 chickens. Throughout Guangdong, Imbudo destroyed 595,000 houses and caused ¥1.9 billion (CNY, US$230 million). There were at least eight deaths in the province.

In Hainan island to the south of the storm track, rainfall reached  in Ding'an County. Imbudo caused flooding in the capital Haikou, and several houses were wrecked. The typhoon affected most of the population, causing an estimated ¥55.35 million (CNY, US$6.7 million) in damage. In Guangxi, 12 people died from storm damage or drowning, and at least 130 livestock were killed. Imbudo destroyed 4,950 houses, 3,170 of which in the city of Yulin, causing ¥499.6 million (CNY, US$60.3 million) in damage in the province. Across southern China, the typhoon damaged over 10 million hectares (25 million acres) of crop fields.

Aftermath
Immediately after the storm, the Philippine Air Force were mobilized to help deliver supplies and aid in search and rescue missions. On July 24, President Gloria Macapagal Arroyo declared that the National Disaster Coordinating Council would provide assistance to citizens affected by the typhoon. The president requested P134 million (PHP, US$2.5 million) for farmers to buy new seeds, and P35 million (PHP, US$650,000) to rebuild the hard-hit Cagayan Valley, where Arroyo visited days after the storm struck. The government ultimately spent about P24 million (PHP, US$435,000) in emergency aid for relocating storm victims, search and rescue operations, and assistance. In Mindanao, officials prepared 800 bags of rice and various other food supplies due to the storm. Power and water outages persisted across Luzon for up to three weeks, causing many factories otherwise undamaged to close. In Isabela province, 25 Tzu Chi volunteers provided supplies to 2,873 houses. The Philippine government provided rice, sardines, and coffee to many affected houses. Damaged houses were supposed to receive 1,000 pesos, although few received the monetary aid. In the town of San Mariano in Isabela province, most farmers incurred more debt and continued their same general farming practice, despite sustaining heavy losses from the storm.

Retirement

In 2004, the World Meteorological Organization retired the name Imbudo and replaced it with Molave. The PAGASA name Harurot was replaced with Hanna for the 2007 season.

See also
List of retired Pacific typhoon names (JMA)
Typhoon Parma
Typhoon Utor
Typhoon Rammasun

Notes

References

External links

RSMC Tokyo - Typhoon Center
Best Track Data of Typhoon Imbudo (0307) 
Best Track Data (Graphics) of Typhoon Imbudo (0307)
Best Track Data (Text)
JMA General Information of Typhoon Imbudo (0307) from Digital Typhoon
JTWC Best Track Data of Super Typhoon 09W (Imbudo)
09W.IMBUDO from the U.S. Naval Research Laboratory

Retired Pacific typhoons
2003 Pacific typhoon season
Typhoons in China
Typhoon Imbudo
Typhoons
2003 disasters in the Philippines
Typhoons in the Philippines
Imbudo